The 1980 Eastern Michigan Hurons football team represented Eastern Michigan University in the 1980 NCAA Division I-A football season. In their third season under head coach Mike Stock, the Hurons compiled a 1–9 record (1–7 against conference opponents), finished in last place in the Mid-American Conference, and were outscored by their opponents, 322 to 81. The team's statistical leaders included Scott Davis with 1,143 passing yards, Albert Williams with 457 rushing yards, and Jeff Dackin with 363 receiving yards.

Schedule

See also
 1980 in Michigan

References

Eastern Michigan
Eastern Michigan Eagles football seasons
Eastern Michigan Hurons football